"Soldier, Soldier, Won't You Marry Me?" is a traditional song, Roud number 489. Fresnostate university gives the earliest date as 1903 in America. It was printed in "Games and Songs of American Children" by William Wells Newell. However the song was collected many times over in a short period of time, including Cecil Sharp in 1917, Anne Gilchrist in Scotland in 1919 and Seamus Ennis in Ireland. Among many arrangements, Peter Pears made an arrangement of the song in 1936.

Lyrics

The main story of the song concerns a woman asking a soldier to marry her, but he says he cannot as he has no nice clothing to put on (hat, coat, boots, etc.). She decides to give the soldier, from her grandfather's old chest which contains his best clothes, each item he asks for. Each verse refers to a different article of clothing. In the last verse, she asks him once again to marry her, but the soldier, all dressed in the woman's grandfather's clothing, refuses once more – as he is already married.

In popular culture
It was recorded by Gid Tanner and his Skillet Lickers in 1930. 

It was recorded by Harry Belafonte on "Mark Twain and Other Folk Favorites" (1954) - long out of print but now available on "Legends Day O" (2012). . Isla Cameron recorded it on "Through Bushes and Briars" (1956), reissued 2011. 

Natalie Merchant recorded it on the album "The House Carpenter's Daughter" in 2003. 

In the 1990 film Dances with Wolves, Kevin Costner's character sings this song as he swims in a creek near Fort Sedgwick.

In the 1982 VHS Golden Nursery Rhymes, a version of this nursery rhyme is sung, with two puppets reenacting the story.

References

Songs about soldiers
Songs about the military
Songs about marriage
English folk songs
Year of song unknown
Songwriter unknown